Edmund Gerald Hood (29 April 1898 – 4 January 1990) was an Australian rules footballer who played with Richmond in the Victorian Football League (VFL).

Notes

External links 

1898 births
1990 deaths
Australian rules footballers from Victoria (Australia)
Richmond Football Club players